Citi Orient Securities Company Limited is a joint venture between Global Markets Asia Ltd. and Orient Securities Co., Ltd with a total of RMB 800 million registered capital, offering investment banking services across equity, debt, and advisory to the Chinese domestic market, including securities underwriting and sponsoring. Established in June 2012, Citi Orient Securities has its headquater in Shanghai , with representative offices in Beijing, Shenzhen, Xinjiang and has more than 400 employees.

References

External links 
 Citi Orient Securities Official Website

Investment banks in China
Financial services companies of China